Tim Peterson may refer to:
 Tim Peterson (politician)
 Tim Peterson (swimmer)
 Tim Peterson (baseball)